I'm Not Here is a 2017 American drama film, directed, edited, and produced by Michelle Schumacher, from a screenplay by Schumacher and Tony Cummings. It stars J.K. Simmons, Sebastian Stan, Maika Monroe, Mandy Moore, Max Greenfield and Iain Armitage. It had its world premiere at the Raindance Film Festival on September 21, 2017, and was released in the United States on March 8, 2019, by Gravitas Ventures.

Plot
Struggling with tragic memories of his past, Steve has cut himself off from the world.  But now, with his own world coming apart, he re-connects with the events of his life to discover how he ended up alone and broken, while still nurturing hope.

Cast
 J.K. Simmons as Old Steve
 Sebastian Stan as Young Steve
 Iain Armitage as Stevie
 Maika Monroe as Karen
 Mandy Moore as Mom
 Max Greenfield as Dad
 Jeremy Maguire as Trevor
 Harold Perrineau as Santana
 David Koechner as Dad's Attorney
 Heather Mazur as Mom's Attorney
 David Wexler as Adam
 Tony Cummings as Judge

Production
In May 2016, it was announced J.K. Simmons, Sebastian Stan, Maika Monroe, Max Greenfield, Mandy Moore, David Koechner, Harold Perrineau, Iain Armitage and Jeremy Maguire had joined the cast of the film, with Michelle Schumacher directing the film, from a screenplay by Schumacher and Tony Cummings. Schumacher, Randle Schumacher and Eric Radzan producing the film, under their Rubber Tree Productions banner. Filming took place  over 23 days in Los Angeles. In February 2017, it was announced Nima Fakhrara had composed the film's score.

Release
The film had its world premiere at the Raindance Film Festival on September 21, 2017. It also screened at the San Diego Film Festival on April 25, 2018. It was released on March 8, 2019.

Reception
On review aggregator Rotten Tomatoes, the film holds an approval rating of 38% based on 16 reviews, with an average rating of 4.97/10. Metacritic gave the film a weighted average score of 45 out of 100, based on 9 critics, indicating "mixed or average reviews".

References

External links
 
 

2017 films
2017 independent films
American drama films
American independent films
Films shot in Los Angeles
2017 drama films
2010s English-language films
2010s American films